Following are the results of the 2016 Finnish Athletics Championships.  The games, known as Kalevan kisat in Finnish, were first held in Tampere in 1907.  The 2016 events were held July 21st through 24th in Oulu.

Results

References

Finnish Athletics Championships
Finnish Athletics Championships
Finnish Athletics Championships